Gheorghe "Gigel" Bucur (born 8 April 1980) is a Romanian former football player. He played as a short and speedy forward.

Bucur has won the top league goalscorer award in the Romanian Liga 1 twice, in the 2004–05 and in the 2008–09 seasons. He was tied on goals with another player on both occasions, first with Claudiu Niculescu and then with Florin Costea.

Club career
Before joining Politehnica, Bucur had only played for Sportul Studenţesc, where he appeared in 169 matches and scored 76 goals in the first two Romanian leagues. He made his debut in the Divizia A during the 2001–02 season. After winning the title of Romanian top league goal scorer of the Divizia A in 2006, he was transferred to Timișoara, for a rumored sum of US$800,000. Sorin Rădoi also came to Poli as part of that deal.

In the autumn of 2009 he scored a brace in the Third Champions League Qualifying Round to help Timișoara knockout Shakhtar Donetsk.

On 3 February 2010, he signed a 3-year contract with Russian club Kuban Krasnodar for a fee worth $1.8 million.

International career
Gigel Bucur first played for the Romania national team in 2005 and amassed twenty six appearances until 2013, scoring four goals, including a brace against Armenia for the 2006 FIFA World Cup qualification.

On 25 March 2008 he was decorated by the president of Romania, Traian Băsescu for the results on Qualifying to EURO 2008 and qualification to UEFA Euro 2008 Group C with Medalia "Meritul Sportiv" – (The Medal "The Sportive Merit") class III.

International goals

Career statistics 

Statistics accurate as of match played 27 May 2016

Honours

Club
Sportul Studenţesc
 Liga II: 2000–01
Kuban Krasnodar
 Russian National Football League: 2010

Individual
Divizia A Golden Boot : 2004–05, 2008–09

References

External links
 
 

1980 births
Living people
Footballers from Bucharest
Liga I players
Liga II players
Romanian footballers
Romania international footballers
FC Sportul Studențesc București players
FC Politehnica Timișoara players
FC Kuban Krasnodar players
Russian Premier League players
Romanian expatriate footballers
Expatriate footballers in Russia
Romanian expatriate sportspeople in Russia
Association football wingers